Bongará is a province of the Amazonas Region, Peru. It borders by the north with Condorcanqui Province, by the East with the San Martín Region and Loreto Region, by the south with Chachapoyas Province and by the west with the provinces of Luya and Utcubamba.

It presents a varied geographical configuration. The branches of the Andes cross it from west to east, dividing it in three regions with proper characteristics:

A swampy region, humid, that spreads between the narrow valley of the Utcubamba river and the quebrada (cliff) called Panhuaico. It has a cold climate. The zones of Jatunpampa, Kurupampa and Santa Cruz are located in this place. This vast region, because of the nature of its soil that has abundant natural grasslands, is called to be an excellent cattle zone.
A region with many geographical accidents, stony soils, with high crags which heights fluctuate between 2,000 to 4,000 m. As an example of the important types of this orography, there are the mountain peaks] of Tocarpo, Cashul, Chambarán, Yumbam and Añacaja. This orographical system runs from south to north and its long ride gives place to a deep region (hoyada), which serves as a cradle to the picturesque lake Pumaqucha.
Finally, an oriental branch goes towards the north, framing the Chiriaco or Imaza river and moves by the East. In this place, the rainforest opens itself to the districts of Yambrasbamba, Chisquilla and Corosha up to the limits with the San Martín Region. In this orographical chain there are the mountain peaks of Yerbabuena, Quitaya, Chiquipata, Calpotrero, Quilahuaita, Chonta Pozo and Ventana.

The hydrographic system of this province is represented by the basins of the Utcubamba river to which numerous gorges come together for both margins and serves as a limit with Luya Province. The Chiriaco or Imaza river crosses it on its South-Western part. The lake Pumaqucha is the principal part of this hydrography that was already described.

Political division

Bongará is divided into twelve districts, which are:

References

See also 
 Nieva River 
 Pumaqucha

Provinces of the Amazonas Region